Harmony Public Schools is the largest charter management organization in Texas, with sixty campuses serving students in kindergarten through 12th grade. The headquarters are located in Southwest Management District (formerly Greater Sharpstown), Houston, Texas,

In 2015, Harmony managed charter schools enrolling 34,203 students.

History
The first Harmony school opened in Houston in 2000. Several Turkish-American graduate students, wrote a charter school proposal and received approval from the Texas Education Agency in April 2000, months before the first campus opened in August.

Within ten years, Harmony expanded to thirty-three campuses across the state, reaching as far as El Paso and Dallas. Now at seventeen years and 54 campuses, Harmony has reached its goal of operating fifty schools and educating 35,000 students by 2020.

Academic performance
Harmony Public Schools works to break down the educational barriers for low-socioeconomic students in the Science, Technology, Engineering and Math (STEM) fields. Its project-based learning method and STEM SOS model requires students to complete multiple hands-on projects per year in select fields, then present their findings to the community. This motivates students to master complex academic concepts and gives them practice at lifelong skills, such as public speaking and communications.

Every Harmony campus passed or exceeded the state's academic standards in 2016, with six of its campuses earning all seven available academic distinctions and two of its districts earning the post-secondary readiness distinction.

In 2011 the Texas Education Agency (TEA) rated 21 of the 33 Harmony schools as "Exemplary" or "Recognized", while the remainder were "Acceptable".

Texas newspapers, including The Dallas Morning News, the Austin American-Statesman, and the West University Examiner, commented favorably on the schools. HSA Houston was awarded by U.S. News & World Report a 'Bronze' medal in 2009 and a 'Silver' Medal in 2010. A Newsweek report in 2011 named two of the Harmony Schools "Miracle Schools".

Participation in competitions 
Harmony Public Schools students participate in a variety of competitions because of the school's emphasis on extracurricular activities. Harmony is especially active in MathCounts, FIRST LEGO League (FLL), DISTCO (Digital Storytelling Contests) Science Fair, and Quiz Bowl. Harmony Science Academy of Euless received an award as the 2010 Best School by the Fort Worth Regional Science and Engineering Fair only a year after it opened. Also, Harmony School of Excellence achieved first place at Nationals in their rookie year and second place in their third year.

Harmony hosts and organizes I-SWEEEP (International Sustainable World Energy, Engineering & Environment Project), a global science fair where students travel from dozens of countries to showcase their projects. Many Harmony campuses traveled to the George R. Brown Convention Center in Houston, Texas, for the expo to support their classmates with exhibits.

Harmony's computer and English classes participate in DISTCO. The DICTCO project evaluates educational videos made by students presenting about their research or stories. The topics of choice include: Art, Cultures/Religions, Computers/Technology, English Language Arts, ESL/Foreign Languages, Health/Medical, Mathematics, Music, Personal Stories/Reflections, Places/Travel, Physical Education/Sports, Pop Culture, Science/Engineering, and Social Studies.

Management and operations

Financial operations
Harmony Public Schools enjoys a AAA financial bond rating awarded by the state and has received numerous federal grants, such as the five-year $30 million Race to the Top grant in 2011. Five Harmony schools in Austin spent $7,923 per student, about $800 below the statewide average and $1,600 below the average of the Austin Independent School District. Kate Alexander of the Austin American Statesman stated that the system had good academic performance "on a shoestring".

The Harmony Public Schools provides management services for other charter school networks. According to Tarim, Cosmos provides consulting services to the San Antonio charter network School of Science and Technology, operated by the Riverwalk Education Foundation, which has a separate school board from Harmony Public Schools.

Harmony in 2015 received $22,791,460 from federal and $229,245,331 from local and state grants.

Business contracting
The Harris County Department of Education assists Harmony Public Schools in its bidding process by reviewing every submission and making a recommendation to the board of directors. The lowest responsible bidder is given the contract. Harmony works with more than 5,000 vendors and its financial interactions are published on the main Harmony website.

The New York Times article in 2011 on Harmony Public Schools and Gülen Movement in Texas reported that "Some of the schools’ operators and founders, and many of their suppliers, are followers of Fethullah Gülen"

Use of H1-B visas
As of the 2016–17 school year, 197 of Harmony's 3,500 employees (approximately 6% of the Harmony workforce) are on H1-B visas. This number was reported to be 292 in June 2011. Most of the employees who are on H1-B visas are from Turkey.

Harmony experienced a lack of qualified math and science teachers in Texas. To alleviate the shortage, Harmony began the Grow Your Own Teacher program, which encourages and financially supports its alumni who earn teaching certificates. This program greatly reduced the number of Harmony teachers on H1-B visas.

A New York Times article in 2011 also raised suspicions about the HB-1 visas used by Harmony, stating that "American consular employees reviewing visas have questioned the credentials of some teachers as they sought to enter the country. "'Most applicants had no prior teaching experience, and the schools were listed as related to' Mr. Gulen [Fethullah Gulen], a consular employee wrote in a 2009 cable", and stating, "Some with dubious credentials were denied visas."

Investigation by Office for Civil Rights
Harmony Public Schools were subject to a compliance review by the United States Department of Education's Office for Civil Rights, examining whether the system was compliant with Title VI of the 1964 Civil Rights Act (prohibiting discrimination on the basis of race, color or national origin), Section 504 of the Rehabilitation Act (prohibiting discrimination on the basis of disability in education programs operated by recipients of federal financial assistance), and Title II of the 1990 Americans with Disabilities Act (prohibiting discrimination on the basis of disability by public entities). The OCR's investigation found that although HPS's admissions policies, procedures, and information provided to prospective students and their parents were prima facie non-discriminatory, the school systems' enrollments of disabled students and English-language learners were significantly lower than for public school districts covering the same geographical areas. In late 2014 the investigation was closed after HPS submitted proposals to resolve the issues identified by the OCR.

Influence of Gülen movement 

William Martin of Rice University said, as paraphrased by Toppo, that "educators' assertions of 'no organic connection' to Gülen are 'accurate,' but that 'their efforts to minimize ties to Gülen, likely from fear of being branded Islamists, bring unnecessary and probably counterproductive suspicion.'"

Schools
Harmony's initial schools opened in areas formerly occupied by stores and leased areas owned by churches; these spaces are typical locations for charter schools. After selling over $645M in state-guaranteed public bonds, Harmony began building its own campuses, although many campuses still occupy leased space.

Austin

 Harmony Science Academy PK-8
 Harmony School of Science K-5
 Harmony School of Innovation PK-5
 Harmony Science Academy-Pflugerville 6–12
 Harmony School of Excellence 6–12
 Harmony Science Academy Cedar Park PK-5
 Harmony School of Endeavor PK-12

Beaumont
K-12
 Harmony Science Academy

Brownsville
K-8
 Harmony Science Academy
6–12
 Harmony School Of Innovation

Bryan/College Station
K-8
 Harmony Science Academy

Dallas
 Harmony School of Innovation-Carrollton K-5
 Harmony School of Excellence  6–12
 Harmony Science Academy Dallas K-12
 Harmony Science Academy Carrollton 6–12
 Harmony School of Innovation-Dallas 6–12
 Harmony Science Academy Plano K-6 
 Harmony Science Academy K-5
 Harmony Science Academy Garland K-6
 Harmony School of Innovation Garland 6-12

El Paso
K-5
Harmony School of Excellence
6–12
 Harmony Science Academy
K-12
 Harmony School of Innovation

Fort Worth
K-5
 Harmony Science Academy
5–12
 Harmony School of Innovation

Garland/Rowlett/Sachse
K-6
 Harmony Science Academy
7–12
Harmony School of Innovation

Grand Prairie
K-8
 Harmony Science Academy

Euless
pre-K-5
 Harmony School of Innovation
6–12
 Harmony Science Academy

Houston

K-8
 Harmony School of Fine Arts and Technology
 Harmony School of Excellence
 Harmony School of Endeavor
 Harmony School of Technology
K-5
 Harmony School of Achievement 
 Harmony School of Enrichment 
9–12
 Harmony School of Advancement
 Harmony Science Academy High School
6–12
 Harmony School of Discovery
K-5
 Harmony School of Exploration                                                      
6–12
 Harmony School of Ingenuity
 Harmony School of Innovation-Katy
6–8
 Harmony School of Innovation
K-5
 Harmony Science Academy-Katy
5–8
 Harmony School of Technology

Sugar Land
K-5
 Harmony Science Academy
6–8
Harmony School of Excellence
9–12
 Harmony School of Innovation – Sugar Land

Laredo
9–12
 Harmony School of Excellence

6–8
 Harmony Science Academy

K-5
Harmony School of Innovation

Lubbock
PreK-8
 Harmony Science Academy

Odessa
K-8
 Harmony Science Academy

San Antonio
6–12
 Harmony Science Academy
Pre-k-8
 Harmony School of Innovation
Prek-8
 Harmony School of Excellence

Waco
K-6
 Harmony Science Academy.
6–12
Harmony School of Innovation.

References

External links

Public education in Texas
Gülen movement schools
Charter management organizations